Kevin Walsh (born 5 November 1969 in Galway) is an Irish Gaelic football coach, manager and former player. He won three All Stars and two All-Ireland Senior Football Championships while playing at senior level for the Galway county team.

Walsh served as manager of the senior Sligo county team from 2008 to 2013 and his native Galway from 2014 to 2019.

Playing career
An effective midfielder, Walsh played at club level with Killannin, winning intermediate county titles in 1991 and 2014 against near neighbours Moycullen at 45 years of age and at inter-county level with Galway. He was a key member of the latter team during the late 1990s and early 2000s and collected two All-Ireland titles and four Connacht titles during that time.

Coaching career

Club
Upon retirement from inter-county play, Walsh became involved in coaching. He had been in charge of the Aran Islands junior footballers in 2008.

Connacht
Walsh was a selector with the Connacht inter-provincial team for a number of seasons.

Sligo
Walsh volunteered to manage the Sligo senior football team, and was appointed in November 2008.

He led Sligo from Division 4 to Division 2 of the National Football League in his first two years in charge winning the Division 4 and 3 titles in the process. He also led Sligo to the Connacht Junior Football Championship and All-Ireland Junior Football Championship in 2010. In 2011, he led Sligo to a second Connacht Junior Football Championship.

In 2013, Walsh fell out with Eamonn O'Hara after O'Hara launched a stinging tirade at his former manager on national television and told him to resign. The incident occurred following Sligo's first round elimination from the Connacht Championship at the hands of London. O'Hara gave his inside view of the chaos affecting the county as Pat Spillane peered down his nose over O'Hara's right shoulder, baffled at the news that a county like Sligo could be in an even worse state than Kerry.

Then O'Hara called Walsh "crazy."

Former Armagh footballer Oisín McConville said O'Hara was out of line with his outburst and pointed out that most teams, apart from those to have played in that year's All-Ireland final, go back training in November. Following defeat to Derry in the next game and elimination from the Championship, Walsh resigned as Sligo boss.

Galway
After the resignation of Alan Mulholland, Walsh was selected as favourite to replace him as manager. Pete Warren was also in the race but withdrew soon afterwards. In September 2014, Walsh was appointed as the Galway Senior Football Manager. On 3 September 2019, Walsh stepped down as manager after five years in charge.

With the onset of the COVID-19 pandemic, Walsh set to the production of his autobiography, which he titled The Invisible Game, and was helped by another man to write it.

Cork
In November 2022, Walsh was announced as coach of the Cork senior footballers, working under the management of John Cleary.

See also
 Brian Walsh (politician)
 Joseph Walsh (archbishop of Tuam)
 Martin Walsh (police officer)

References

1969 births
Living people
All Stars Awards winners (football)
Connacht inter-provincial Gaelic footballers
Cork county football team
Gaelic football coaches
Gaelic football managers
Gaelic football selectors
Galway inter-county Gaelic footballers
Garda Síochána officers
Killannin Gaelic footballers
Winners of two All-Ireland medals (Gaelic football)